Echophenomenon (also known as echo phenomenon; from Ancient Greek ἠχώ (ēkhṓ) "echo, reflected sound") is "automatic imitative actions without explicit awareness" or pathological repetitions of external stimuli or activities, actions, sounds, or phrases, indicative of an underlying disorder.
  
The echophenomena include repetition:
 echolalia (syn. echophrasia) – of vocalizations (the most common of the echophenomena)
 echopalilalia – of words
 echopraxia (syn. echokinesis, echomatism) – of actions, movements
 echopathy – of actions or speech
 echoplasia – physically or mentally, tracing contours of objects
 echolalioplasia – involving sign language, described in one individual with Tourette syndrome.

References

Tourette syndrome
Schizophrenia